Batavia Public School District 101 (BPS101) is a school district headquartered in Batavia, Illinois. The district is run by a superintendent and is overseen by a seven-member elected school board.

Batavia previously had two school districts serving western and eastern portions; they combined into BPS101 in 1911.

Schools
 Secondary
 Batavia High School
 Rotolo Middle School
 Primary
 Alice Gustafson Elementary School and Early Childhood Center
 Hoover-Wood Elementary School
 Grace McWayne Elementary School
 J. B. Nelson Elementary School
 H. C. Storm Elementary School
 Louise White Elementary School

Board 
A board made up of seven community members is elected every two years in alternating election years. The Board has a president and vice president and holds public meetings monthly. The Board oversees the District's finances and policy, and appoints a superintendent. The current Board president is Cathy Dremel and current vice president is Erin Meitzler.

Issues

Racism, queerphobia, and bullying 
In December 2021, students, parents, and teachers described experiences of racism, queerphobia, and bullying they had faced in the District at a school Board meeting.  A committee established by the Board confirmed that many marginalized students reported feeling unsafe at school in February 2022. On May 24, 2022, dozens of people rallied before a school Board meeting being held later that evening to call for the District to do more to help marginalized students in the District.

References

External links
 Batavia Public School District 101

1911 establishments in Illinois
School districts established in 1911
School districts in Illinois
Education in Aurora, Illinois